The Leader of the opposition in the Andhra Pradesh Legislative Assembly is the official leader of principal opposition party in assembly. The leader of opposition is given rank of cabinet minister and is entitled to draw monthly salary and other perks of the same Rank.

List of leaders of the opposition
The current incumbent is N. Chandrababu Naidu of the Telugu Desam Party since 30 May 2019.

After the state reorganisation in 2014 Y. S. Jagan Mohan Reddy of YSR Congress party became the first leader of opposition in Andhra Pradesh Legislative Assembly followed by N. Chandrababu Naidu of Telugu Desam Party in 2019.

In fact N. Chandrababu Naidu is the longest serving leader of opposition . He served as leader of opposition in United Andhra Pradesh Legislative Assembly for a period of 2004 – 2014 in Andhra which includes current day Andhra Pradesh and Telangana states N. Chandrababu Naidu is the last leader of opposition of Andhra Pradesh before its  bifurcation . Y. S. Jagan Mohan Reddy of YSR Congress party became the first leader of opposition becomes first leader of opposition of bifurcated Andhra Pradesh

Leader of the Opposition

Eligibility
Official opposition is a term used in Andhra Pradesh Legislative Assembly to designate the political party which has secured the second largest number of seats in the assembly. In order to get formal recognition, the party must have at least 10% of total membership of the Legislative Assembly. A single party has to meet the 10% seat criterion, not an alliance. Many of the Indian state legislatures also follows this 10% rule while the rest of them prefer single largest opposition party according to the rules of their respective houses.

Role
The opposition's main role is to question the government of the day and hold them accountable to the public. The opposition is equally responsible in upholding the best interests of the people of the country. They have to ensure that the Government does not take any steps, which might have negative effects on the people of the country.

The role of the opposition in legislature is basically to check the excesses of the ruling or dominant party, and not to be totally antagonistic. There are actions of the ruling party which may be beneficial to the masses and opposition is expected to support such steps.

In legislature, opposition party has a major role and must act to discourage the party in power from acting against the interests of the country and the common man. They are expected to alert the population and the Government on the content of any bill, which is not in the best interests of the country.

Statistics

List of leader's of opposition by length of term (Following state's bifurcation in 2014)

List of leader's of opposition by time line (Following state's bifurcation in 2014)

References

Leaders of the Opposition in Andhra Pradesh